The Wilts & Berks Canal is a canal in the historic counties of Wiltshire and Berkshire, England, linking the Kennet and Avon Canal at Semington near Melksham, to the River Thames at Abingdon. The North Wilts Canal merged with it to become a branch to the Thames and Severn Canal at Latton near Cricklade. Among professional trades boatmen, the canal was nicknamed the Ippey Cut, possibly short for Chippenham.

The  canal was opened in 1810, but abandoned in 1914 – a fate hastened by a breach at Stanley aqueduct in 1901. Much of the canal subsequently became unnavigable: many of the structures were deliberately damaged by army demolition exercises; parts of the route were filled in and in some cases built over. In 1977 the Wilts & Berks Canal Amenity Group was formed with a view to full restoration of the canal.

Name
The official name of the canal is the "Wilts & Berks Canal" as cited in the Private Acts of Parliament that authorised its building and abandonment. The "Wiltshire and Berkshire Canal" is incorrect. Neither is it correct to refer to the "North Wilts Canal" as the "North Wiltshire Canal".

The canal's original name is retained for historical reasons despite local council boundary changes in 1973 that transferred part of Berkshire through which the canal passes (mostly the Vale of White Horse) to Oxfordshire.

Construction
A plan for the canal was published by Robert Whitworth Snr. and William Whitworth in 1793. The Bill empowering construction of the canal received Royal Assent in 1795. It allowed the company to raise £111,900 through 1,119 shares at a cost of £100 each for the construction of the canal. Another Act of Parliament was passed in 1801 that allowed the company to raise a further £200,000 to complete the canal.

The canal was cut during the years 1796 to 1810. Robert Whitworth Snr. remained as an engineer on the canal from 1796 to 1799. William Whitworth was resident engineer during this period and, upon Robert's departure, he became engineer until the canal's completion, for which he was paid £255,262.

Following completion, a further two Acts were passed in 1810 and 1813 to alter toll rates on the canal, and another Act was passed in 1815 to allow the company to raise £100,000 to pay off debts collected during the construction of the canal, and to construct a reservoir.

Route
There were 42 locks on the main line and three on the Calne branch. There were three short tunnels.

While the main canal was opened in 1810, some branches were operating before this and others added afterwards. The North Wilts Canal from Swindon to the Thames and Severn Canal at Cricklade was opened in 1819; it had 11 locks. It was originally a separate company, but merged with the Wilts & Berks following an Act of Parliament in 1821.

Operation
Coal came from the Radstock and Paulton mines in the Somerset coalfield by way of the Somersetshire Coal Canal, which joined the Kennet and Avon Canal near the Dundas Aqueduct. In 1837,  of coal were transported via the Wilts & Berks Canal from the Somerset coalfield, with  being handled at Abingdon wharf. The Wilts & Berks thus became a link in the chain of canals providing a transport route between the West Country and the Midlands. Water supply was always a problem and a reservoir was constructed near Swindon to supply the canal, now known as Coate Water.
From the reservoir, a feeder meandered northwards and eastwards, to feed water into the canal near Marston Locks.

Competition from the railways, especially the Great Western Railway from 1841, meant that the Wilts & Berks Canal was never a great commercial success. In addition, long stretches of the canal were through a type of clay that is unsuitable for lining a canal,  so there was a constant need for puddling, making maintenance costs prohibitive. Despite this, the Wilts & Berks Canal operated for more than a century, though traffic had pretty much ceased by 1901. In that year a breach occurred at Stanley Aqueduct over the River Marden, an event that proved to be the death knell of the canal.

Abandonment

The canal was formally abandoned by an Act of Parliament in 1914. The Act was sponsored by Swindon Corporation, which gained control of all the land within its boundary. In other areas ownership returned to the owners of adjacent land.

From the early 1930s much of the canal was filled in and generally used for dumping rubbish. Chippenham Wharf, once home to Brinkworth's Coal Depot, was used by residents as a refuse tip, and council minutes from 1926 show a decision to dump pig offal in the disused waterway. A bus station was built on the site, the buried wharf being uncovered briefly during redevelopment in 2006.

During the Second World War many of the locks and other canal structures were used for army exercises and damaged by explosives.

Very little of the old canal survived in usable form, but long rural stretches are clearly delineated.

Restoration

In 1977 the Wilts & Berks Canal Amenity Group was formed to protect what remained of the canal, and to restore short sections for their amenity value. Their first projects included the clearing of sections at Kingshill, Shrivenham, Dauntsey and Wootton Bassett. Ten years later this became a major restoration project.

The Wilts & Berks Canal Trust was formed in 1997 as a partnership between the W & B Canal Amenity Group and the district and county councils covering the route of the canal. This included the District Councils of North Wilts, West Wilts and Vale of White Horse, the County Councils of Oxfordshire and Wiltshire, and Swindon Borough Council. The aims of the Trust were to protect, conserve and improve the canal and its branches, with the ultimate aim of restoring the whole canal to navigable status. However, the legal structure of the group was unsuitable for accessing some of the grants available for canal restoration, and so it was reformed into the Wilts & Berks Canal Partnership in 2001.

Although development has taken place on some of the land of the canal, much of its route is intact, especially in rural areas. The "line" of the canal has been preserved in Local Development Plans, which means that no new building or development should now take place on the former canal.

The connection of the canal with the River Thames at Abingdon had been closed by development. On 30 August 2006 the Jubilee Junction was opened, providing a new connection with the River Thames further downstream near Culham Lock.

The Trust is progressing with re-watering many of the rural sections, and is working with local councils to construct new sections (possibly including new tunnels) where urban development has made the original route unavailable. Not all development has been urban, however. In Uffington, for instance, a farm has been built on the old wharf site, over the filled canal.

By 2006, a number of bridges and locks had been rebuilt and at least  of the canal were in water. On 26 May 2009, Double Bridge and a short section of rewatered canal to the south of Pewsham was officially opened by the Trust's patron, Camilla, Duchess of Cornwall. With the help of a grant from the Gannett Foundation and many hours of work by volunteers, this section was extended to the foot of Pewsham Locks in 2012.

There are some significant engineering challenges lying ahead for the Trust, but they offer opportunities to improve the areas surrounding the canal. The M4 motorway at Swindon was built over the line of the canal. Swindon Council are supporting the restoration of the canal, and are actively planning to route it through the town centre, albeit not quite on the original route. In 2007 a feasibility study suggested that a proposal to construct a canal through Swindon would cost £50m. Despite some objections, Swindon Borough Council gave approval in 2008 for further investigation of the scheme proposed by the Wilts & Berks Canal Trust. The Thames Valley Chamber of Commerce Group also welcomed the project "as a key element in transforming Swindon's town centre into a leisure and visitor attraction, disposing of its dreary reputation."

The plans were submitted to Wiltshire Council in August 2012, but the Trust were required to produce supporting documentation. The environmental statement ran to 350,000 words and was published in five volumes in 2015, but the Environment Agency required further information, and supplementary reports were produced in March 2018 and January 2019. After delays caused by the COVID-19 pandemic, communication with the Environment Agency resumed, and agreement on the final two obstacles to the plan was reached. Details were submitted for planning approval in early 2022.

The Wilts & Berks Canal Trust has the following active restoration projects:

Note: Much of the route is over land in private ownership with no rights of public access, which may include restoration sites.

Restoration issues
There is some controversy about the restoration of the canal, in particular the felling of trees and the corresponding short-term disruption of wildlife habitats that have evolved in the 100 or so years since the canal was abandoned, and this has been addressed in the North Wiltshire Local Plan.

The trees that most frequently have to be removed are Salix × fragilis (crack willow), a fast-growing, short-lived member of the willow family. These have seeded themselves on the towpath side of the canal and may shed large branches in windy weather and are therefore hazardous. Trust work parties consisting of unpaid volunteers may be called out at short notice to deal with trees that have fallen across the towpath, blocking the way for walkers and cyclists.

The Trust aims to keep local groups and residents informed and involved with the work. Senior members of the Trust regularly give talks and guided walks along the canal. These are intended to show how a linear wildlife corridor can be created from what has formerly been stagnant water with rubbish dumped in it. The phrase used is "not even wildlife likes a stagnant canal".

Objections to a canal route through Swindon town centre are believed to arise from misconception that canals contain "stagnant water". However canals are permanently moving water slowly downstream, and are thus not stagnant. The passage of boats keeps the water stirred up making it muddy-looking, but this is essential to prevent the growth of weeds. In January 2008 Swindon Council considered a report, prepared by their consultants, on the feasibility and implications of restoring the town centre route. They endorsed the proposal, and have set up a task group to make further progress.

There is concern in south Oxfordshire about the risk of flooding, and it can be argued that the canal will act as a drainage system, helping to take excess water and move it away to the Thames. The Environment Agency have expressed concerns about the proposed route of the canal at Melksham, and its effect on the floodplain, and there have been calls from local landowners to ensure that a town-centre route is re-established.

Trust work parties are installing fencing, accommodation bridges and drainage as well as undertaking tree maintenance and removal where required.

Map of route

See also

Canals of Great Britain
History of the British canal system

References

Further reading

External links

 Wilts & Berks Canal Trust
 A Brief History of the Wilts & Berks Canal, Peter Scatchard, W&BCT – archived November 2018
 
 Trading on the Wilts & Berks Canal, Reg Wilkinson, Vale and Downland Museum – archived December 2016
 W&BCT: East Vale Branch – Jubilee Junction (River Thames) to Childrey
 W&BCT: Cricklade Branch – North Wilts Canal
 W&BCT: Swindon Branch – Illustrated description of the proposed route through Swindon
 Image and map of a mile marker from the Wilts & Berks canal

1810 establishments in England
History of Berkshire
Kennet and Avon Canal
Transport in Oxfordshire
Canals in Wiltshire
Tourist attractions in Oxfordshire
Tourist attractions in Wiltshire
CWiltsandBerks
Canals opened in 1810